Melanomma auricinctaria, the gold-lined melanomma moth, is the only species in the  monotypic moth genus Melanomma of the family Erebidae. It is found in the United States and Canada. Both the genus and species were first described by Augustus Radcliffe Grote in 1875.

References

Calpinae
Monotypic moth genera